Denham County, is one of the 141 Cadastral divisions of New South Wales. It lies between the Barwon River and the Namoi River, where the two rivers meet. It includes the localities of Koothney, Cryon and Bugilbone.

Denham County was named in honour of Captain H. M. Denham, H.M.S. Herald.

Parishes within this county
A full list of parishes found within this county; their current LGA and mapping coordinates to the approximate centre of each location is as follows:

References

Counties of New South Wales